The Tian Shan dhole (Cuon alpinus hesperius), also known as the Siberian dhole, Western Asiatic dhole, or northern dhole is a subspecies of dhole native to the Altai and Tian Shan mountain ranges, and possibly Pamir and Kashmir.

Characteristic

The Tian Shan dhole is somewhat smaller than the Ussuri dhole, with a relatively wider skull and much lighter, straw-coloured winter fur coat. It has a short, wide face and a skull measuring 180 mm long on average. The top of the head and outer sides of the ears are reddish-straw coloured. The upper surface of the neck is dirty-white, with a narrow, sandy-yellow-coloured band running along the upper surface of the back from the ears to the shoulders. The outer surfaces of the limbs are sandy-yellow, while the flanks and inner sides of the limbs have little to no yellowish tint.

The auditory bullae of this subspecies has distinct morphology compared to other dhole subspecies.

Distribution and habitat

The Tian Shan dhole's habitats consists of mountain ranges and other areas with colder climate. It currently lives in the Tian Shan and the Altai Mountains.

The dhole was once widespread from Northeast to southern Central Asia in Transoxiana. They formerly lived in Siberia, Mongolia, Kazakhstan, Kyrgyzstan and Turkmenistan. The Tian Shan dhole still occurs in Tibet. A few still live in the Gansu Province from northwestern China. Although dholes have not been recorded in Pakistan, they once occurred in the alpine steppes extending into Kashmir.

Hunting and diet

It feeds primarily on Siberian ibexes, arkhar, argali, roe deer, maral and wild boar, as well as musk deer and reindeer.

References

Dhole
Carnivorans of Asia
Mammals of Central Asia
Mammals of China
Mammals of Mongolia
Mammals of Russia
Fauna of Tibet
Tian Shan